Liberia is a multilingual country where more than 20 indigenous languages are spoken. English is the official language, and Liberian Kolokwa is the vernacular lingua franca, though mostly spoken as a second language. The native Niger-Congo languages can be grouped in four language families: Mande, Kru, Mel, and the divergent language Gola. Kpelle-speaking people are the largest single linguistic group.

Notes and references